Bad Deutsch-Altenburg, until 1928 Deutsch-Altenburg is a market town and spa in the district of Bruck an der Leitha in Lower Austria in Austria.

Geography
The town lies in the Lower Austrian Industrieviertel region, on the right riverbank of the Danube River and the Danube-Auen National Park, south-west of Hainburg an der Donau and Devín Gate. On 8 August 2013 it recorded 40.5C which is the highest temperature ever recorded in Austria.

The health resort is centered on iodine and sulfur springs, which are one of the most powerful in Central Europe.

Climate
Bad Deustch-Altenburg in the transitional zone between having an oceanic climate and a humid continental climate (Cfb bordering on Dfb according to the Köppen climate classification).

History

The settlement in the Duchy of Austria, located around a medieval castle at the site of the former Roman camp of Carnuntum, was first mentioned in 1297 and received market rights in 1579. The prefix Deutsch- was added to differ it from nearby Altenburg (Óvár) in Hungary. From 1916/17 it was the site of a large longwave and high frequency radio transmitter station, which was dismantled in the 1980s.

In March 1945 numerous Jewish forced labourers were deported on a death march from the South-east wall to Bad Deutsch-Altenburg where they had to embark up the Danube to Mauthausen concentration camp. A memorial stone marks the site of a mass grave, where exhausted prisoners shot by the security forces were buried.

Politics
Seats in the municipal assembly (Gemeinderat) as of 2010 elections:
Social Democratic Party of Austria (SPÖ): 7
Austrian People's Party (ÖVP): 5
Team Altenburg(Independent): 5
Wir Altenburger (Independent): 1
Freedom Party of Austria (FPÖ): 1

Notable people
 Carl Hollitzer (1874—1942), caricaturist, singer and cabaret artist
 Blessed Anton Durcovici (1888—1951), Catholic clergyman and Bishop of Iaşi
 Hannes Swoboda (born 1946), politician

References

Cities and towns in Bruck an der Leitha District
Spa towns in Austria
Holocaust locations in Austria
Populated places on the Danube